Kinaua Biribo (born 14 August 1993 in South Tarawa) is an I-Kiribati judoka.

She represented her country in the middleweight tournament of the 2020 Summer Olympics, after participating at the 2021 World Championships (70 kg) in Budapest, and will be the flagbearer at the Tokyo opening ceremony. She competed in the women's 70 kg event.

Life
Kinaua started judo as well as traditional kiribati wrestling to find a way to self-defense after her experience of sexual assault and abduction at age 6.Kinaua uses her platform to raise awareness of climate change and volunteered with the Kiribati Climate Action Network (Kiri-CAN).

References

External links
 

1993 births
Living people
I-Kiribati female judoka
Olympic judoka of Kiribati
Judoka at the 2020 Summer Olympics